The County and Borough Police Act 1856 or the Police Act 1856 (19 & 20 Vict. c. 69) was an Act of the Parliament of the United Kingdom. It was one of the Police Acts 1839 to 1893. The Act made it compulsory for a police force to be established in any county which had not previously formed a constabulary.

The Act required that in any county where a constabulary had not already been established for all or part of the county, then the justices of the peace for the county should at the next general or quarter sessions held after December 1, 1856, proceed to establish a sufficient police force.

Where the Secretary of State received certified notice that an efficient police force had been established in any county or borough, then one quarter of the costs of pay and clothing for constables would be met by the Treasury.

However, boroughs maintaining a separate police force and having a population of 5,000 or less were to receive no financial support, thereby encouraging smaller forces to consolidate with the county police.

Finally, the Act provided that the Cheshire Constabulary, which had been established by a private Act of Parliament in 1829 (10 Geo. 4, c. 97) and amended by an Act of 1852 (15 & 16 Vict. c. xxxi), would be replaced by a force under the terms of the new Act.

References

United Kingdom Acts of Parliament 1856
Police legislation in the United Kingdom